Batch plant may refer to:
Asphalt batch mix plant
Concrete plant